T Express is a wooden roller coaster at Everland in Yongin, South Korea. It is South Korea's first wooden coaster, Intamin's fourth wooden coaster with prefabricated track, the first ride of this type in Asia, and the first to utilize three trains. It is world's fourth steepest wooden roller coaster. It is also the world's ninth fastest, fourth tallest, and third longest wooden roller coaster (behind only The Beast at Kings Island and The Voyage at Holiday World). It is also built on a hillside, the layout taking advantage of the terrain.

T Express was ranked as the world's best wooden coaster in Mitch Hawker's online poll in 2008 and 2010.

The biggest change brought by T Express was an increase in the number of customers, especially teenagers and university students. The number of college students increased by 14%, and teenagers by 73% according to Everland statistics.

Rocky Mountain Construction, an Idaho-based manufacturing firm, assisted with the construction of the ride.

Awards

References

External links

 T Express official Homepage (Korean)

Everland Resort
Roller coasters in South Korea
Roller coasters introduced in 2008